Naajakassait is a cape of the Anarusuk Island in the Upernavik Archipelago, Greenland. 
The cape is in the northern part of the island in the near of Nuuluk Island.

Anarusuk
Tasiusaq Bay